René Ouvrard (1624–1694) was a French priest, writer and composer.

Ouvrard was born in Chinon.  He received orders and became kapellmeister of the cathedral of Bordeaux, Narbonne and the Sainte-Chapelle of Paris, then he was a canon in Tours. He became a priest in 1682. He died in Tours.

Main works
 Secret pour composer en musique par un art nouveau, 1660
 L'Art et la Science des nombres en latin et en français, 1677
 Défense de l'ancienne tradition des Églises de France, 1678
 Histoire de la musique chez les Hébreux, les Grecs et les Romains

References

External links
  René Ouvrard, on Mots d'auteurs

1624 births
1694 deaths
People from Chinon
French composers
French male composers
Roman Catholic writers
17th-century French Roman Catholic priests
French music theorists
French male non-fiction writers
17th-century classical composers
17th-century male musicians